Caisse, a French word, may refer to:

Caisse Desjardins, an association of credit unions in Quebec
Caisse d'Epargne-Illes Balears, a road-bicycle racing team
Caisse de dépôt et placement du Québec, a public pension fund in Quebec
Caisse nationale suisse d'assurance en cas d'accidents, a Swiss insurer
Caisse de Stabilisation des Prix du Coton, a Chadian government agency
Mouvement des caisses populaires acadiennes, a credit union in the Canadian province of New Brunswick

See also
Caïssa, a neoclassical goddess of chess
Kaissa, a chess program developed in the Soviet Union in the 1960s
Kaïssa, a Cameroon born world musician.
Caisson (disambiguation)